Padre Pio TV, formerly known as Tele Radio Padre Pio, is a Catholic television channel belonging to the Capuchin Friars of San Giovanni Rotondo, a city in the province of Foggia, Italy, the place where lived and died the saint Padre Pio of Pietrelcina to whom the TV channel is dedicated.

Distribution 

Padre Pio TV programming is broadcast on digital terrestrial television systems to the entire national territory of Italy on channel position 145. Padre Pio TV is available to free-to-air satellite television viewers in Europe and the Mediterranean area via Eutelsat Hot Bird 13C @ 13,0° Est Trasponder 158, in the frequency of 11,662 MHz, Trasponder 158, DVB-S2 8PSK, Vertical pole, 27,500 Ms / s, 3/4, with the name Padre Pio TV. It also broadcasts on a radio broadcasting system to the outskirts of the province of Foggia.

Internet users can view the channel through the website padrepio.tv, or with applications for iOS or Android mobile devices.

Programming

Religious services and devotional programs 
A partial listing of Padre Pio TV schedule:

 Candles procession from the Sanctuary of Saint Pio of Pietrelcina
 The Angelus from the Basilica of the Holy House in Loreto
 Holy Mass from the Church of Saint Mary of Graces (San Giovanni Rotondo)
 Rosary from the crypt of Church of Saint Mary of Graces (San Giovanni Rotondo)
 Chaplet of the Divine Mercy
 Dialogo

Patron saints 
Saint Mary of Graces is considered the co-patroness of Padre Pio TV. The patron saint of this Italian Catholic channel is Saint Pio of Pietrelcina.

The Italian singer and TV host Raffaella Carrà, a devotee of Padre Pio, was considered the channel's godmother.

See also
 Catholic television
 Catholic television channels
 Catholic television networks
 International religious television broadcasters
 Radio Maria
 Telepace
 Vatican Media

References

External links
 Padre Pio TV – Official Website
 Padre Pio TV online broadcast
 Padre Pio TV on YouTube

Catholic television networks
Catholic television channels
Television networks in Italy
Television channels in Italy
Television channels and stations established in 2003